The 1949 Vermont Catamounts football team represented the Vermont Catamounts football team of the University of Vermont during the 1949 college football season.  Despite a 2–0 conference record, the league title was awarded to both Connecticut and Maine, who finished with 2–0–1 league records, with their tie coming against each other.

Schedule

References

Vermont
Vermont Catamounts football seasons
Vermont Catamounts football